The Lower East Side Preparatory High School is an American public school serving students of grades 9, 10, 11, and 12 between the ages of 14 and 21. It is located at 145 Stanton Street, on the Lower East Side of Manhattan in New York City, New York.

History and operations
The school originated from Manhattan's Chinatown neighborhood in 1973.

Its first students were mainly Chinese immigrants. After merging into the New York City Board of Education, the school became a transfer school, with services roved students from five boroughs of the New York City and from other countries.

Around eighty percent of its students attend college after graduation. It offers Bilingual Spanish/Chinese classes, ENL programs, as well as multiple Advanced Placement classes, extended day, preparatory for the Regents Examinations and robotics programs. The school's mission is to prepare students for college studies and their future careers.

See also

 List of high schools in New York City

References

1973 establishments in New York City
Chinatown, Manhattan
Educational institutions established in 1973
Lower East Side
Public high schools in Manhattan